"Dōshite Suki to Itte Kurenai no" (Japanese: どうして好きといってくれないの) is the fourth single by Carlos Toshiki & Omega Tribe released by VAP on July 21, 1989. The song was used as the theme song and ending song for the Tokyo Broadcasting System program Hitachi Sekai Fushigi Hakken!, later being used in the band's third album Bad Girl. The B-side, "Buraindo Purofīru" was used in the band's compilation album Our Graduation. The song charted at No. 24 on the Oricon charts.

Both songs were composed by Tetsuji Hayashi, who was the composer for the previous version of the band Kiyotaka Sugiyama & Omega Tribe. The B-side was written by Yasushi Akimoto, who was one of the lyricists for S. Kiyotaka & Omega Tribe.

Track listing

Single

Charts

References 

Omega Tribe (Japanese band) songs
1989 singles
1989 songs
Songs written by Tetsuji Hayashi